is a Japanese recording artist, DJ, and actress from Zama, Kanagawa, Japan. Having been discovered at the talent TV show Asayan, she was one of the most popular female teen idols in the late 1990s. However, in 2000, Suzuki faced legal problems with her management company resulting in a controversial blacklisting from the entertainment industry. Suzuki attempted to resurrect her career under her own steam with two indie singles before signing to Avex Trax in 2005. She released "Delightful", a dance song that reached No. 3 on the Japanese Oricon charts with a style similar to electronic club music, significantly different from her pop idol days. Since her appearance in the 2006 film Rainbow Song, Suzuki has gradually made a name for herself in the acting field, starring in various movies, television series, and musicals.

Biography

1998: Asayan and debut
While attending high school, Ami auditioned for Japanese talent show Asayan, which was searching for a young vocalist under the direct guidance of Tetsuya Komuro. She initially preferred athletics to auditions and was reluctant to travel from her home in Kanagawa, but was convinced by a school friend. The TV contest became very popular and the number of viewers watching it grew and grew as the series progressed; its popularity was such that soon it was aired in other Asian countries. From 13,500 contestants, only five girls were chosen to be in the final round, and 15-year-old Suzuki won the competition supported by 802,157 phone calls from the audience. She later explained her win as being down to her showing her natural-self, as opposed to rehearsing intensely like other contestants.

Sony Music signed her to the label, and producer Tetsuya Komuro sponsored her career producing all of her material, together with other members of the Komuro Family, such as Marc Panther, Cozy Cubo and Takahiro Maeda. Her debut single, "Love the Island", was released on 1 July 1998. The song was used to promote Japanese tourism in the island of Guam, with Suzuki herself starring in the TV commercials. The song was well promoted, with Ami appearing on covers of magazines like Young Jump and even traveling to Guam to promote the song live on the local version of the international music channel MTV. The single became a hit, debuting at number five on the Oricon charts. On 17 September 1998, her second single "Alone in My Room" was released. This song was also used for Guam tourism campaigns, and also did well on the charts, debuting at number three on Oricon and selling even better than its predecessor. In October 1998, Suzuki started her own radio show on Nippon Hōsō called Run! Run! Ami-Go!, which topped the radio rankings in popularity. She also signed a deal with the Japanese product Kissmark for advertisements and promotion all around Asia. Sony then began promoting her third single, "All Night Long". The dance song was featured constantly at the most famous discothèque of Japan at that time, Velfarre, and was a big hit. It debuted at number 2 on the Oricon charts. Later that year, Ami Suzuki won various awards including the Japan Record Award for Best New Artist.

1999–2000: SA, Infinity Eighteen and popularity peak
In 1999, Suzuki released her first photo book, titled Ami-Go, which sold around 200,000 copies. In March, her debut album SA was released, becoming one of the Top 10 best selling albums of 1999. At the release of her seventh single "Be Together" (which was a cover of a song by TM Network), Ami competed with "rival" Ayumi Hamasaki for the first time for the top position in the charts. Ayumi released her ninth single, "Boys & Girls", on the same day. Ami went to the top position on the Oricon charts for the first time, leaving Ayumi second. However, "Boys & Girls" would go on to become a number one single itself and eventually outsell "Be Together". Her next single, titled "Our Days", also ranked number one in the charts later that year. At the end of the year, Ami released her eighth and last single in 1999 entitled "Happy New Millennium", which debuted at number 2 and sold 364,000 copies, becoming Suzuki's second lowest single in 1999.

In January 2000, Suzuki released "Don't Need to Say Good Bye" which debuted at number 5. A week later, Suzuki released her second studio album, Infinity Eighteen Vol. 1, which sold 1,063,000 copies and debuted at number one. Suzuki has said of this first period of her career that she was not free to do what she wanted and only followed what she was told, leaving her feeling "pretty disheartened and down, like there was no future.". Suzuki had been writing lyrics from an early age and passing them to her manager and producers. The first song to feature them, with the help of Mitsuko and Tetsuya Komuro, was her tenth Sony single, "Don't Need to Say Good Bye". The lyrics were influenced by events occurring in her personal life at that time, specifically her upcoming high school graduation and she has said: "it was more important to me than sales and chart rankings to know that I had put my thoughts and feelings into what I was singing." Three months after Infinity Eighteen Vol.1, Suzuki released her twelfth single, "Thank You 4 Every Day Every Body" in the beginning of April and third studio album, Infinity Eighteen Vol.2 at the end of April. "Thank You 4 Every Day Every Body" sold a total of 234,000 copies reaching number one and Infinity Eighteen Vol.2 sold a total of 427,000 copies reaching number two. "Reality/Dancin' in Hip-Hop" was Suzuki's 12th single released under the Sony Music Japan label, on 27 September 2000. It reached number 3 on Oricon weekly chart and sold a total of 211,000 copies. A compilation album of Suzuki's tracks, Fun for Fan, was released on 30 May 2001. It reached number 1 on the Oricon charts, despite the fact that by this point, Suzuki herself had vanished from the public eye and Sony had taken all of her previous singles and albums off CD shelves.

2000–2002: Legal problems and blacklisting
In 2000 Suzuki's career came to an abrupt halt when Eiji Yamada, the President of her production company AG Communication, was convicted on tax evasion charges. AG Communication had evaded tax by under-reporting their earnings, and by consequence were underpaying royalties to artists. Suzuki's parents Tadao and Miyako Suzuki sued AG Communication for termination of her contract on these grounds, and that the association would taint her squeaky clean image. They attempted to set up a subsidiary called Music Tribe to solve the problem. The Tokyo District Court found in her favor, but the lawsuit resulted in Ami Suzuki's blacklisting because of an unwritten rule of the entertainment business in Japan: artists who get into legal disputes with their agents are blacklisted. In court documents, it was revealed that AG Communication had paid her very little, to begin with: despite eight-figure record sales that year, Suzuki earned just $1500 a month at the start of her career, and a minuscule 0.4% royalty rate on CDs, raised to $9780 and 0.55% in 1999.

Having lost all of her endorsements too, Suzuki was faced with the problem of production companies refusing to sign her and tried to make a comeback in the next two years with little to no success. Her relationship with her producer, Tetsuya Komuro, also ceased. Sony also took all of her singles and albums released up to that point off CD shelves. Many people were convinced that her chances for making a comeback were nil. In 2003, Suzuki finally negotiated an out-of-court agreement with Sony. Her contract with the label was scheduled to end in December 2004. Eiji Yamada was subsequently fined for his role in the tax evasion. Government officials linked to the scandal included former Education Minister Takashi Kosugi and two other legislators, who allegedly received 34 million yen in unofficial payments for referring AG Communication and other clients seeking tax evasion. About this period, Suzuki herself has said "I really didn't know what was going on, lots of lies were being thrown about in the media. For people to hear little things on the TV and believe that to be the truth was a surprise, and I suddenly realized the kind of world I was in. What kept me going was the thought of one day being able to tell the truth myself"

2003–2004: As an indie artist
Following the blacklisting, Suzuki changed her stage name from 鈴木あみ (kanji/hiragana) to 鈴木亜美, her real name written in kanji. In April 2004, without a major record deal, the singer found "after some research, that adding a CD to a book, such as those found in language-teaching books, would be a possible alternative." She thus released a photo book called Tsuyoi Kizuna that included a CD single, published by Tokyo-based Bungei Shunju. The photobook went to sell over 150,000 copies despite the low promotion, reaching the No. 1 place of best-selling non-fiction books in Japan. In August of the same year, she released another single titled "Forever Love", this time on her own independent label Amity. The release sold quite well for an independent record, reaching number 21 on the Oricon chart and number 1 in Oricon's Indies Singles Chart. In addition, a four-track mini concert DVD titled 2004 Summer Fly Hight: Ami Shower was released on 17 November 2004. Throughout October and November 2004 she began a tour through university festivals, and in December she began another tour called Ami's Love for You – Live.

2005–2006: Comeback on Avex and Around the World
At the last venue on Suzuki's nationwide tour, Ami's Love For You – Live, held on 30 December at Tokyo Public Welfare Annuity Hall, she officially announced her transfer to Avex and her comeback to major music industry. On 1 January 2005, her official website under the Avex label was officially opened. Her first song under her new label, "Hopeful", was released virtually on 9 February, and on 25 March her first physical single, titled "Delightful", was released. The dance song was produced by German trance musician Axel Konrad and it was released in four different formats (CD, CD+DVD, CD+Photobook, CD+Illustration Essay). "Delightful" debuted at number two on Oricon's charts, and was later placed at number 97 in Oricon's Yearly Top 500 best singles of 2005. Her second single under the Avex label, titled "Eventful", was released on 25 May 2005. Also being a dance track, it had moderate sales, debuting at number nine on the Oricon charts. The third Avex single, "Negaigoto", was released on 17 August 2005, also enjoying moderate success. Its B-side, "Times", was used as the main theme of a TV commercial of N's Street Online Shopping, starring Suzuki herself. During August 2005, her new official Mobile Fan Club "Ami Sapuri" was opened, and Suzuki announced that a live tour would start in the following months. This year she also participated for the first time in A-Nation, a yearly concert of the most popular artists of Avex Trax.

Suzuki released her first studio album in five years, Around the World, on 12 October 2005, with the simultaneous release of a single of the same name. The album consisted of J-pop songs heavenly influenced by trance music, and ballads. It debuted at number five on the Oricon charts, selling 50,000 copies. In November 2005, celebrating the Japanese 55th Anniversary of Snoopy, Suzuki released a single titled "Happiness is...", which was sold exclusively at the Snoopy Life Design Happiness is the 55th Anniversary event held in Tokyo. On 7 December 2005, Suzuki released her 5th Avex single, Little Crystal. The maxi single was a four A-side single that included four different ballads arranged by four different musicians. "Crystal" and "To be Free" were the songs that had music videos made for promotion. The single debuted at number twenty-two, selling 15,000 copies in its first month. On 31 December 2005, Suzuki was awarded with the a Gold Prize for Best New Artist at the 47th Japan Record Awards.

On 8 February 2006, Suzuki released her sixth Avex single, "Fantastic", which was used as third opening theme of the TV anime series Blackjack, making this the first time that one of her songs was used in an anime. On 29 March 2006, her first remix album, titled Amix World, was released. The album included remixed made by Japanese and international producers, including Space Cowboy, Clazziquai Project, Jonathan Peters and Ferry Corsten. For her fifth single "Alright!", released on 17 May 2006, she distanced herself from her previous trance-influenced dance material and went into more mainstream J-pop themes under the arrangement of HΛL. Suzuki's eighth single on Avex, "Like a Love?", was released 26 July 2006. The song was composed by label mate Ai Otsuka, making this the first time that she offered one of her own compositions to another artist. In October of the same year, Suzuki debuted as a movie actress in Rainbow Song, directed by Naoto Kumazawa and produced by Shunji Iwai. In late 2006, Suzuki covered two Disney songs, "Beauty and the Beast" and also "Zip-a-Dee-Doo-Dah", which were at first only available on the Disney Music Store Japan's website starting on 20 December 2006.

2007–2008: The "join" project, Connetta and Dolce
In February 2007, Suzuki officially started a new project called "join", in which she would be collaborating with different artists and experimenting with various music styles. The collaboration singles with Buffalo Daughter, THC!! and Kirinji were released in a three-week period starting on 28 February to 14 March. Her "join" album and second Avex album, Connetta, was released on 21 March, and included collaborations with several artists including Hideki Kaji, Scoobie Do, Ayano Tsuji and Northern Bright. The album peaked at number twenty-six on the Japanese Oricon charts. Her acting career went more seriously at this time; she starred in the live action drama Skull Man, and also recorded the Japanese-South Korean collaboration drama Under the Magnolia, in which she starred the leading role along with Lee Wan and travelled to New York and South Korea to shoot certain scenes. She was also invited for a third time at 2007's a-nation, where she was chosen as the opening act.

A new single with electropop producer and capsule leader Yasutaka Nakata then emerged. Her fourth "join" single and first Avex double A-side single, "Free Free/Super Music Maker", was released on 22 August 2007. For this single's promotion Suzuki's image changed drastically, from a cute pop image to a more mature and erotic style. Her new look was called as "ero-pop" by herself and Japanese media, even making comparisons with label mate Kumi Koda. This single did considerably better than the previous "join" singles, debuting at number 32 on the Japanese charts, and achieving more than eight thousand copies sold, almost the three previous singles sales combined.

Suzuki's fifth collaboration single, "Potential Breakup Song", a cover of Aly & AJ's single of the same name produced by Sugiurumn, was released on 28 November 2007. Aly & AJ's version of the song was used as the theme song of horror/comedy film XX (X Cross), in which Suzuki starred as the lead role along with Nao Matsushita. Suzuki released her second "join" album and third Avex studio album, Dolce, on 6 February 2008. The album, which was much more dance-oriented than its predecessor, included collaborations with Ram Rider, Studio Apartment, Tomoe Shinohara, Captain Funk, and others. In December 2007 it was announced that Suzuki would be starring a new TV drama called Oishii Depachika, which was inspired in the anime Oishii Ginza by Ikuko Sagakawa. The TV drama premiered in January 2008 on TV Asahi.

2009–2011: Supreme Show and DJ debut
In 2008, Suzuki celebrated her tenth anniversary in the music industry, leaving behind the "join" project and working once again with producer Yasutaka Nakata. The first anniversary single "One" was released on 2 July 2008. The song was used as the theme song for the Japan 28th National High School Quiz Championship, and charted at number 17 on the Oricon charts. At the release party of the single on 5 July, Suzuki officially launched her career as a DJ, and performed live along with Nakata. The second anniversary single, titled "Can't Stop the Disco", was then released on 24 September 2008. This same month, Suzuki debuted as the main character in the Avex 20th anniversary musical, Kokoro no Kakera, along with Yu-ki from TRF. In November, Suzuki played the main role in another TV drama: this time for the 40th anniversary special remake of Ai no Gekijo's Love Letter. Suzuki played the hearing-impaired Minami Tadokoro, whose dramatic love life was explored over a 15-year period. Her tenth anniversary album, Supreme Show was released on 12 November 2008. The album was fully produced by Yasutaka Nakata.

Suzuki's 28th single, "Reincarnation", produced by Taku Takahashi of M-Flo, was released on 25 February 2009. From 27 September – 7 August 2009, Suzuki starred in her second musical: "Blood Brothers". Suzuki recorded a song called "Kiss Kiss Kiss", a cover of a song by Ananda Project which appeared on the House Nation compilation called Aquamarine released on 5 August and was later released as her 29th single on 28 October 2009. In 2010, Suzuki's cover version of Kylie Minogue's international hit "Can't Get You Out of My Head" appeared on the compilation "Tokyo Girls Collection" 10th Anniversary Runway Anthem She also collaborated with special unit Phoenix 2:00am, formed by Dj Koo from TRF and Motsu from m.o.v.e. She provided vocals for them in the song "Living in the Castle", which appeared on the compilation House Nation 3rd Anniversary. They were formed exclusively to perform the theme song of a videogame event called Sengoku Busho Matsuri held at Saitama Arena on 6 and 7 March 2010. In July 2010, Suzuki released Blooming, her first compilation album as a DJ. It was a 15-track collection of songs mixed by herself. In August 2011, Suzuki worked with her former producer Tetsuya Komuro for the first time in ten years, as she provided vocals for his song "Thx A Lot", in which the main female artists of the Avex label also collaborated and performed it live at 2010's A-Nation concerts on 28 and 29 August. In September 2010, she met with Komuro for a studio recording in Los Angeles.

On 9 February 2011, her 29-year-old birthday concert was broadcast online live via the website Nico Nico Douga. In March 2011, after the 2011 Tōhoku earthquake and tsunami, Suzuki joined Gackt's charity campaign "Show Your Heart" for collecting money for the victims. On 27 July 2011, a newly recorded version of her debut single "Love the Island" was released as a special collaboration with clothing store Resoxy, and clients could download the song for free from the store's website. On 29 July the song was released on iTunes. In October 2011, it was announced that Suzuki would be releasing her first Avex greatest hits album on 7 December. The album, titled Ami Selection, included most of her singles released under the Avex label, as well as new versions of various hit singles from the Sony era produced by Tetsuya Komuro, and her indie single "Tsuyoi Kizuna".

2012–present: Snow Ring
In 2012, Suzuki started as the host of a series of parties under the name Who's Shining??, which she organized and participated as of the DJ acts. Several artists had participated in the Who's Shining? events, including Genki Rockets, May's and others. She also took courses and started to work as food analyst, starting to become involved in the process of food production and dinner organizations for her events. In addition, in September 2012, she participated in the musical Hashire Melos along with musicians Ryuichi Kawamura, Kazumi Morohoshi, Izam and Nami Tamaki. This year Suzuki has also ventured as a designer. In July, she released a series of iPhone cases designed by herself, and along with other Japanese celebrities, she designed an android-like Hello Kitty which will be exhibited in August at a fundraising event held by Sanrio in Tokyo.

In December 2012, it was announced that Suzuki would be releasing a new song, "Snow Ring", which would be used as theme song for the smartphone game Makina x Dolls. Snow Ring was released as a mini album on 6 February 2013, and included three new songs, the cover of "Can't Get You Out of My Head" by Kylie Minogue and two remixes. The EP also included a DVD with the full Ami Suzuki 19th Anniversary Live concert.

On 2 June 2014, it was announced that Suzuki would be releasing a new single titled "Graduation", produced by Tetsuya Komuro. The song, which was meant to commemorate Suzuki's 15th anniversary since her debut, was her first new song produced by Komuro since 2000. The song was released digitally on 4 June.

Personal life
On 1 July 2016, Suzuki married a person not related to the entertainment business. They have two sons (born 12 January 2017 and 15 February 2020) and a daughter (born 15 August 2022).

Discography

Studio albums
 1999: SA
 2000: Infinity Eighteen Vol. 1
 2000: Infinity Eighteen Vol.2
 2005: Around the World
 2007: Connetta
 2008: Dolce
 2008: Supreme Show

Photobooks
AmiGo, 1999
Amix, 2000
Ami '02 Natsu, 2002
Ami Book, 2003
Tsuyoi Kizuna, 2004

Awards

Filmography

Film

Television

Theater plays
Kokoro no Kakera (2008)
Blood Brothers (2009)
King of the Blue (2010)
Watashi no Atama no Naka no Keshigomu (2010)
Genghis Khan: Wa ga Tsurugi, Nessa o Shime yo (2011)
Hashire Melos (2012)
Shinshū Tenma Kyō (2013)

TV commercials 
Guam Tourism Campaigns (June 1998 – December 1998)
Alpen Snowboards' Kissmark (October 1998 – January 1999)
PlayStation 2's Monster Rancher 2 (February 1999 – April 1999)
Asahi Soft Drinks's Bireley's (March 1999 – December 2000)
Kodak Cameras (April 1999 – March 2001)
MOS Burger (July 1999)
Kanebo Cosmetics' Prostyle (September 1999 – June 2001)
ECCJ's Summer/Winter Energy Saving Campaign (February 2000 – August 2000)
Bourbon (September 2000 – June 2001)
Music.jp (November 2004 – December 2004)
Nexus Web Marketing's N's Street (August 2005)
Mister Donut/Avex CD Campaign (July 2008)
Sanyo Shinpan Finance's Pocket Bank (May 2009)
Nissei Advance 10th Anniversary (Oct 2011)

References

External links
 
Suzuki Ami Database 

1982 births
Avex Group artists
Japanese film actresses
Japanese musical theatre actresses
Japanese television actresses
Japanese female dancers
Japanese idols
Japanese women pop singers
Japanese women singer-songwriters
Japanese singer-songwriters
Living people
People from Zama, Kanagawa
Nihon University alumni
Japanese synth-pop singers
Musicians from Kanagawa Prefecture
Yasutaka Nakata
21st-century Japanese actresses
20th-century Japanese women singers
20th-century Japanese singers
21st-century Japanese women singers
21st-century Japanese singers
Japanese women in electronic music